Hughes v Huppert [1991] 1 NZLR 474 is a cited case in New Zealand regarding affirmation.

References

New Zealand contract case law
1991 in case law
High Court of New Zealand cases